Tim Metcalfe is a fictional character from the British television soap opera, Coronation Street, played by Joe Duttine. He made his first on-screen appearance on 21 January 2013. Duttine had previously appeared in the soap between February and June 2010 as D.S. Carr, the police officer that arrested Gail McIntyre (Helen Worth) for the murder of her husband, Joe McIntyre (Reece Dinsdale). Tim is introduced as Faye Windass' (Ellie Leach) biological father. His storylines initially focused on his relationship with his long-lost daughter Faye and her adoptive family - mother Anna Windass (Debbie Rush) and her partner Owen Armstrong (Ian Puleston-Davies). Tim's storylines have since revolved around his relationship to Sally Webster (Sally Dynevor) - whom he illegally married, and the birth of his granddaughter Miley (Erin, Eilah and Elsie Halliwell).

Storylines
Tim arrives in Weatherfield, after his biological daughter Faye Windass (Ellie Leach) makes contact with him over the internet. Faye begins sneaking out to see Tim, which her adoptive mother, Anna Windass (Debbie Rush) puts a stop to. Tim clashes with Anna's boyfriend Owen Armstrong (Ian Puleston-Davies) but after Faye's insistence, they allow her to visit Tim. Faye becomes growingly infatuated with her father, which escalates when Tim gets a job and moves into 15a Coronation Street, and Faye's constant pushing makes Anna let her live with Tim, to his initial delight. However, Tim soon realises the independence he has forgone in order to become a full-time father. After Faye lies to Tim about staying with Anna while he was away at a job in Newcastle for a few days, he agrees that Faye should move back in with Anna again. Owen tells Tim to leave and Tim agrees after deciding Faye would be better off without him. However, Tim has a change of heart after Faye refuses to speak to him and decides to stay in Weatherfield for good. Soon afterwards, he begins a relationship with Sally Webster (Sally Dynevor), but hides from her in his flat above the Corner Shop when she plans for them to go on a romantic weekend break to Paris together. After talking to his boss Jason Grimshaw (Ryan Thomas), Tim decides he wants a relationship with Sally and commits to her.

Tim is angry when Sally leaves Faye and her friend Grace Piper (Ella-Grace Gregoire) on their own, although Grace manipulated the situation to try and cause trouble. Tim becomes concerned when Faye is questioned by the police for bullying Simon Barlow (Alex Bain). He later confides in Sally that he blames himself for being a bad father.

In January 2014, Tim decides to turn over a new leaf and set up his own window cleaning business, and he leaves the building trade. He also moves in with Sally and her daughter, Sophie (Brooke Vincent). Maddie Heath (Amy James-Kelly) breaks into the house while Tim is there and when he tries to stop her, Maddie punches him. Embarrassed by what has happened, Tim lies to police and tells them a man broke in and he confronted him. Maddie tells Sophie what she did and she tells Tim that she knows Maddie punched him, but agrees to not tell Sally. Weeks later, Maddie accidentally lets slip to Sally what really happened. In May 2014, Tim and Sally realise that their relationship is not working, so Tim decides to move out and rearranges a letting agreement with Dev Alahan (Jimmi Harkishin), so that he continue seeing Faye. The couple later realise they were wrong to split after one argument and redeclare their love. Sally is delighted when Tim proposes, but both realise they are not ready for marriage. Upon the return of Sally's ex-husband, Kevin Webster (Michael Le Vell) from Frankfurt, Tim decides to buy his 50% share of their house so he and Sally can have a proper future together.

In April 2015, Tim is left shocked when Faye gives birth to a baby girl, who she names Miley (Erin, Eilah and Elsie Halliwell). Tim loves the idea of having a grandchild, seeing it as a second chance to be a father figure, but Faye does not want to be a mother. Tim, Anna and Owen question Faye about the baby's paternity and Owen leaves after attacking Faye's  teenage friend, Craig Tinker (Colson Smith), thinking that he is the father due to him spending a lot of time with her. Anna becomes Miley's primary carer while trying to persuade Faye to take an active role in Miley's life. Tim enjoyed the time he spent with Miley and is pleased when Miley's father, Jackson begins taking responsibility; but is upset to realise Miley will spend less time with Faye. Tim suggests Faye and Jackson Hodge (Rhys Cadman) register her birth and have Miley christened. At Miley's christening, Faye breaks down and admits to Tim that she is not ready to be a mother. Seeing that Faye is unable to cope, Jackson's wealthy parents, Greig and Josie, suggest Miley live with them, leaving Tim devastated. Tim comes round to the idea, thinking it would be best for everyone. Despite Anna's reservations, Miley goes to live with Jackson and his family and the Windasses say a tearful goodbye. Weeks later, Tim admits to Anna and Faye that they, most likely, will never see Miley again, as the Hodges have emigrated to Canada. Tim and Anna discuss it with Faye and Tim promises he will get Miley back but Faye decides Miley will have a better life over there.

In July 2015, Tim goes to Underworld and publicly asks Sally to "not marry him". Tim becomes close friends with her ex-husband Kevin, sometimes even irritating him. On Kevin's birthday, Tim buys Kevin a friendship bracelet, which Kevin secretly dislikes. On the same day, Sally kisses Kevin, but they decide to keep it secret. Months later, Anna discovers the truth and whilst drunk, tells Tim in front of everyone in the Rovers. A furious Tim ends his engagement to Sally, leaving her devastated. Sally becomes depressed and stands firm that the wedding will take place, despite Tim's refusal to acknowledge her. Kevin and Anna try to convince Tim to reconcile with Sally, with Kevin finally getting through to him. Sally stands at the altar with Sophie, Faye and Rita Tanner (Barbara Knox) and refuses to leave until Tim joins her. Tim eventually arrives and they get married. Tim and Sally then go on their honeymoon and when they return, it is clear they are happy together. In early-December 2015, Tim is overwhelmed with guilt when he accidentally runs over Sarah Platt (Tina O'Brien) in his new van, however Sally and other residents of the street attempt to convince Tim that it was not his fault.

Sally later buys Lloyd Mullaney's (Craig Charles) share of the StreetCars taxi firm for Tim, with Tim working alongside co-owner Steve McDonald (Simon Gregson), sparking a new friendship. Sally is elected a local councillor for Weatherfield but her snobbish behaviour puts a strain on her and Tim's marriage, so he begins to brew his own beer, which becomes very successful with the residents. When Steve discovers that Will Chatterton (Leon Ockenden) kissed his wife Michelle Connor (Kym Marsh), Tim fights with Will for Steve as his arm is in a sling.

In March 2018, Tim becomes instrumental in exposing the crimes perpetuated by Anna's rapist and Eileen's husband: Pat Phelan (Connor McIntyre). He first manages to entrap Phelan in admitting to his role in the "Calcutta Street" flats scam project, though is unable to get Phelan to confess to framing Anna for pushing their daughter's boyfriend - Seb Franklin (Harry Visinoni) - off a ladder as well as killing both Michael Rodwell (Les Dennis) and Luke Britton (Dean Fagan). However, the truth about Phelan is publicly revealed when Gary and Seb - while seeking to uncover the gun Phelan used to kill Luke - end up unearthing the bodies of Phelan's two other murdered victims: Michael's surrogate son Andy Carver (Oliver Farnworth) and Phelan's ex-business partner Vinny Ashford (Ian Kelsey). Upon learning from Gary about this, Tim alerts Eileen about Phelan's crimes and he along with her best friend Liz McDonald (Beverley Callard) race over to the cottage where the pair are stating at - where they are relieved to find Eileen safe and that Phelan is presumed dead. The following day, Tim informs most of the residents about Phelan's crimes as the police descend into Weatherfield.

In December 2019, Tim discovers he is a bigamist as he is already married to a woman called Charlie Wood (Siân Reeves) following a wedding in Las Vegas in 2004, making his marriage to Sally invalid. After a lot of persuasion, Charlie finally signs the divorce papers so he can marry Sally. Sally wanted to keep Tim's bigamy a secret from the street, but was furious to find that everyone knew and almost split up with Tim over it; they reconciled soon after and was divorced from Charlie in mid-2020. Tim and Sally married in October 2020.

In April 2020, Geoff was attacked by Yasmeen after months of psychological abuse and coercive control. Tim and Sally knew nothing of what Geoff was really like or what he had been putting Yasmeen through, so Tim was indoctrinated by his dad against the truth. Sally grew doubtful of Geoff's version of events after he was released from hospital and after Geoff's use of escorts came to light and Sally talking to Alya, she decided to kick Geoff out of No.6. She was also asked by Alya to be a witness for Yasmeen, and she accepted. Tim still remained doubtful over what Alya had been saying about Geoff and stuck by his dad. This didn't change when in July that year, a woman called Elaine Jones arrived in Weatherfield. Elaine was revealed as Geoff's first wife Philippa Metcalfe, who Geoff had said died of cancer in the 1970s in Spain. From the off, Sally believed her and with hers and Alya's help tried to tell Tim who she was; Tim didn't believe her and rejected her. This soon changed in September 2020, when Sally got hold of Geoff's laptop to try to get hard evidence of Yasmeen's ordeal and also to prove to Tim that Alya and Elaine are telling the truth. After watching the video, Tim saw the light and confronted his dad and disowned him. He apologised to Alya and tried to contact Elaine to make amends but when he visited her address and there was stacks of unopened post he discovered she had gone missing. They were eventually reunited in December that year and Elaine agreed to testify at Yasmeen's upcoming trial. She did despite Geoff's threats, and Elaine's testimony as well as CCTV footage of Geoff at the hospital on the day he threatened her and the phone footage of Geoff threatening Yasmeen, the jury ruled in Yasmeen's favour. Geoff died in December 2020 after falling off the roof of No.6 after trying to kill Yasmeen. After Geoff died, this allowed Tim and Elaine to bond as mother and son and for everyone to move on with their lives.

Tim was devastated when Faye was sent down for 3 years in April 2021 for attacking Adam Barlow in a case of mistaken identity, Faye was attacked by Ray Crosby a few months before. Faye was eventually released in November that year after Ray admitted to assaulting her.

In 2022, Tim finds out he has a heart condition and needs a serious operation. He doesn’t tell Sally, and instead confides in Aggie Bailey (Lorna Laidlaw) about the situation. Sally only finds out just before the operation.

Casting
The character was revealed to be entering the show in August 2012 by series producer, Phil Collinson. He stated "We know that Faye's mother is dead, but there's a father out there somewhere and he's going to come along and challenge things for Anna." On 13 January 2013, it was announced that Joe Duttine had been cast in the role of Tim. Tom Eames from Digital Spy reported that Anna Windass (Debbie Rush) would become concerned for her adoptive daughter, Faye, when she makes contact with Tim online. A spokeswoman commented that Anna is hurt when she learns that Faye has contacted Tim and warns him to stay away.

Development

Relationship with Sally Webster
In 2013, Tim began a relationship with the snobby Sally Webster, portrayed by Sally Dynevor. Talking about Sally and Tim's new relationship, Dynevor said: "He's a bit of a commitment-phobe so I'm not sure [what will happen], but he's nice and Sally really likes him. She's trying to change him - manipulate him into what she wants! But he's not having it and he wants to go off down the pub, and doesn't want to spend any romantic weekends with her or anything. He's a real bloke - he wants his tea on the table!" Dynevor later spoke out on the relationship, stating she thought the relationship was doomed to fail: "I didn't really want Sally to find someone at first, but I like this relationship because she's not found 'Mr Perfect'. All the other men Sally's been with, I could easily have seen her having long term relationships with them. With Tim, you know there's no way they're going to live happily ever after, they're going to drive each other insane. I like the drama that has to offer." In an interview on ITV chat show, Loose Women, Duttine said that he does not want Tim to change his unreliable ways, but said he thought Tim "does really love" Sally. However, Dynevor was ultimately wrong as Tim and Sally's relationship became popular with viewers and therefore, continued from strength-to-strength. In November 2013, show producer Stuart Blackburn teased that Tim and Sally's relationship could be tested by the return of Sally's ex-husband, Kevin Webster (Michael Le Vell) the following year: "Kevin left at a point when he really thought he wanted to get back with Sally. Kevin loves Sally and seeing her with another man will be heartbreaking for him, but he’s going to have to man up and deal with it." In January 2014, OK! reported that Tim would become involved in a love triangle with Sally and Kevin following his impending return to the show. In September 2014, as Kevin was set to return, Blackburn told Digital Spy that they would not be reuniting Kevin and Sally, "Kevin will always regret what he did in the past and there'll always be a 'What if?' when it comes to Sally. His love for Sally won't go away, but I think it's time for him to move on and he will do that. Kevin has figured out now that Tim and Sally are for real. If there is going to be any type of affair, it's more likely to be Tim and Kevin heading off for a pint behind Sally's back!"

In May 2014, Tim decided his relationship with Sally should come to an end and dumped her. Discussing Tim's reason behind his actions, Duttine said: "She was getting a bit judgmental about Tim’s opinion of Maddie, and she wasn’t very sympathetic about Maddie’s situation with Ben. Plus, she was being a bit snobby about his window cleaning job. She lost her sense of humour, and I think when Tim tried to lighten the mood, it didn’t go down very well. He just thought she was being too much of a nightmare and bailed out. For Tim, it’s all about having an easy life and not wanting too much conflict or confrontation." They quickly reunited and when Sally spots Tim in a jewellers, she jumps to the conclusion he is going to propose. This makes Tim consider proposing to Sally. Talking to Lynn Connolly of Unreality TV, Duttine said: "He goes in there to buy Faye a watch, but then Sally jumps to the conclusion that he’s going to propose to her. He then goes to buy a ring with the intention of proposing to Sally because he feels it’s what she wants, not because he wants it. So I guess he does love her, and he’s putting her first and trying to please her." Duttine continued to say how after Tim proposes, they discuss their relationship and realise neither of them want to get married, before revealing he "un-proposes" to Sally in the Rovers Return Inn. Duttine said he thought this was "sweet". Duttine also went on to say how he felt Tim and Sally were a "good, fun couple". In May 2015, Duttine and Dynevor discussed Tim and Sally's relationship with  Phillip Schofield and Amanda Holden on ITV daytime programme, This Morning, with Dynevor saying how she initially thought Tim and Sally would not go well as a couple: "I was like, 'Tim Metcalfe and Sally Webster – how is that going to work?' but as soon as they put us together and we got the script and starting working together we found things hilariously funny." Duttine commented that Tim is "just pleased to be here and glad somebody will have him." and Dynevor agreed, saying that Sally "feels the same – she’s just glad she has a boyfriend!"

Live episode (2015)
Coronation Street announced their plans for a live episode in September 2015 to mark the sixtieth anniversary of ITV on 19 November 2014. The show's producer, Stuart Blackburn, said: "We’ve a reputation to uphold after the success of the tram crash and I’m going to enjoy working with the storyliners and writers as we plot stories for our live episode in 2015. We’ll be doing all we can to eclipse what’s gone before." In August 2015, a new storyline began airing which saw Sally and Kevin share a small kiss, behind Tim's back and then choose not to tell him. Michael Le Vell (who plays Kevin) told Sophie Dainty of Digital Spy that Kevin would be left "in total shock and disbelief" and is "genuinely shocked" when Sally kisses him. Despite Kevin and Sally agreeing to not tell Tim, Le Vell said he thought the kiss would be revealed to Tim: "I don't think it will stay a secret, no. I'm not sure who will tell who but I do know Sophie is quite suspicious - whether anyone else close to Sally or Kevin will be brought into the loop I don't know. But if Tim finds out, he's not going to be happy." Annie Price of the Daily Express revealed the storylines that would be featured in the live episode as to be: the Platt family's feud with Callum Logan (Sean Ward) reaching its climax; the beginning of Roy Cropper's (David Neilson) relationship with Cathy Matthews (Melanie Hill); and the comedic element to the show, Tim's discovery that Kevin and Sally shared a kiss. Le Vell later revealed that the secret would be exposed in the live episode by a character that is drunk: "I think that someone spills the beans in a very drunken stupor in the live [episode]. I don't know what the consequences are going to be but there's something very exciting."

On 9 September 2015, Coronation Street announced that the live episode would air for an hour on 23 September in a 19.30 timeslot. The cast gathered for their first read through of the live episode script on 8 September. On 13 September, Le Vell and Brooke Vincent (who plays Sally's daughter, Sophie) told STV that the storyline involving Sally, Tim and Kevin would "inject a little bit of humour" into the live episode. Vincent went on to say how viewers will "have to keep watching" to find out if the wedding will commence. Describing the role Sally, Kevin and Tim's storyline plays in the live episode, Le Vell said: "It’s all linked to Tim and Sally’s wedding and I think someone lets the cat out the bag – we don’t know who that is – about the kiss on their wedding day, but we don’t know the full impact of Tim finding out." Duttine spoke to Daniel Kilkelly of Digital Spy, insisting that Tim should not become aggressive when he discovers Sally and Kevin's kiss: "I don't really want to see Tim become aggressive or become a player either. I just think that he's a decent bloke who likes his creature comforts and a simple life." Duttine continued to talk about the fallout of the revelation: "I think Tim will be heartbroken when he finds out the truth. It's definitely not going to be plain sailing. As for whether Tim will punch Kevin, I don't think Tim's the fighting type." Duttine and Dynevor later discussed their thoughts on going live with Katie Fitzpatrick from the Manchester Evening News, with Duttine admitting that going live is one of "the scariest thing you’ve ever done because you don’t want to be the first one to mess up Coronation Street after years and years." Dynevor admitted she was worried she would break into uncontrollable laughter, "My fear, working with Joe, is corpsing for me. Once you start laughing you can’t stop."

In the build-up to the live episode, Anna overheard Sally discussing her kiss with Kevin to Sophie, leaving her intrigued. The episode aired on 23 September and featured a drunk Anna telling Tim that Sally had kissed Kevin a matter of weeks before. Despite Sally's best efforts to convince Tim that Anna was lying, he realised Anna was not lying and left the pub in shock and upset. Tim then packed his bags and stayed with Anna and Faye, leaving Sally crying into the arms of Sophie. The episode was met with positive reviews with many Twitter users tweeting their views on the live episode and Duttine's acting.

Family
In May 2014, Dianne Bourne, reporting for the Manchester Evening News, said producers were looking to cast a disabled actor in his 40s. The character, named Howie, was branded a "cheeky chappy" by Bourne. Later, in September, it was revealed that Howie would be the cousin of Tim, with show producer Stuart Blackburn teasing Tim and Howie's relationship: "There is also going to be a new character called Howie arriving. He is Tim's cousin and will be providing much more fun for the Websters. In the past, Tim's relationship with Howie has been incredibly fragile. They never see eye to eye, and Howie loves winding up Tim." Despite Blackburn also mentioning that the show were in the final stages of auditioning and that Howie would begin appearing in early 2015, Howie never appeared.

In March 2018, Ian Bartholomew joined the cast as Geoff Metcalfe, Tim's father. Geoff's relation to Tim was not revealed until transmission on 30 March, although viewers of the show guessed the twist beforehand. In July 2020, after the introduction of Geoff's ex-wife Elaine Jones (Paula Wilcox), fans began theorising that she is Tim's biological mother, despite Geoff telling Tim that his mother, whom he named Tessa Metcalfe, is dead. Producers later confirmed the theory to be correct.

Reception
James Brinsford of the Metro praised Coronation Street for highlighting the issue of illiteracy through Tim, stating that less than one per cent of adults are completely illiterate and said "Bravo Corrie!" for showing that despite the low statistics, it is still possible. Radio Times David Brown praised the pairing of Tim and Sally, commenting: "Tim and Sally have been comedy gold since they got together". Dan Martin of The Guardian also praised Sally and Tim's relationship, calling it "the best story in Corrie of recent months." He went on to say: "If they can play the serious emotional stuff as well as they have done the comedy, they’ll surely seal their place in the Corrie Couples Hall of Fame".

Duttine and Dynevor won the award for Best On-Screen Partnership at the 2015 British Soap Awards. They were nominated for the same award at the Inside Soap Awards of the same year. Duttine was also nominated for Funniest Male in the award ceremony. Duttine made the shortlist, eventually winning the award. However, Duttine and Dynevor did not make the shortlist and Emmerdale Charlie Hardwick and Chris Chittell (who play Val and Eric Pollard) won the award.

References

Notes

External links

Coronation Street characters
Fictional construction workers
Television characters introduced in 2013
Fictional taxi drivers
Fictional businesspeople
Male characters in television